Karl Gisbert Friedrich Freiherr von Vincke (also Carl von Vincke;  von Vincke-Olbendorf, 1800–1869) was a Prussian officer and politician.

Early life 
Born into the baronial Vincke family, he was born as the son of Franz Friedrich Ernst August von Vincke (1798-1866) by his wife, Bertha Ganzer (1808-1893). He was a cousin of liberal politician Georg von Vincke.

Career 
He served in the Prussian Army from 1817, from 1829 in the general staff, from 
1832 in the rank of captain in VI. Armee-Korps. He participated in the military reform of the Ottoman army as an advisor from 1837, and participated in the war in Egypt in 1840. Later in 1840, he was promoted to major and reassigned to the Gardekorps.
He left the active service in 1843, but remained in the army until 1850, reaching the rank of lieutenant colonel. 
From 1843, he began to participate in politics on the liberal party even while maintaining a personal friendship with William I, German Emperor, facilitating both his escape into exile following the March Revolution of 1848, and his return later in June of the same year.
He was a member of the Landtag of Prussia from 1849 to 1854, and from 1850 member of the 
Erfurt parliament. From 1858 until his death he was a member of the Prussian House of Representatives.
He served as a witness in the pistol duel between Otto von Bismarck and Georg von Vincke in 1852.

References

     
Bernhard Mann, Martin Doerry, Cornelia Rauh, Thomas Kühne (eds.), Biographisches Handbuch für das Preußische Abgeordnetenhaus: 1867–1918. (1988), p. 395.

Prussian politicians
Prussian Army personnel
1800 births
1869 deaths